Amine Dinar (born 13 June 1995) is a Moroccan former professional footballer who played as a midfielder.

Club career

Early career 
Whilst growing up Dinar played football in his native Morocco as well as Niger and Gabon, where his father worked as a diplomat. He returned to Morocco in 2011 and played with FAR Rabat when at the age of 18 he earned a move to French club Paris Saint-Germain.

Paris Saint-Germain 
Dinar joined Paris Saint-Germain from FAR Rabat on 1 July 2013 on a three-year contract. Dinar ultimately made just eight appearances during his spell at Paris Saint-Germain.

National team
Dinar has represented his nation at various youth levels. He earned his first cap for the senior national football team of his country on 12 December 2012, after coming on as a substitute in the 3-0 win over Niger in a friendly match.

Honours

International
Morocco
Islamic Solidarity Games: 2013

References 

1995 births
Living people
Moroccan footballers
Paris Saint-Germain F.C. players
Association football midfielders